Jim Kelly (9 December 1928 – 9 January 1995) was a New Zealand cricketer. He played in one first-class match for Wellington in 1950/51.

See also
 List of Wellington representative cricketers

References

External links
 

1928 births
1995 deaths
New Zealand cricketers
Wellington cricketers
Cricketers from Auckland